Second normal form (2NF) is a normal form used in database normalization. 2NF was originally defined by E. F. Codd in 1971.

A relation is in the 'second normal form if it fulfills the following two requirements:
 It is in first normal form.
 It does not have any non-prime attribute that is functionally dependent on any proper subset of any candidate key of the relation (i.e. it lacks partial dependencies). A non-prime attribute of a relation is an attribute that is not a part of any candidate key of the relation.

Put simply, a relation is in 2NF if it is in 1NF and every non-prime attribute of the relation is dependent on the whole of every candidate key. Note that it does not put any restriction on the non-prime to non-prime attribute dependency. That is addressed in third normal form.

2NF and candidate keys
A functional dependency on a proper subset of any candidate key is a violation of 2NF. In addition to the primary key, the relation may contain other candidate keys; it is necessary to establish that no non-prime attributes have part-key dependencies on any of these candidate keys.

How to decompose into 2NF 
To make a 1NF relation a 2NF relation, remove the functionally dependent attributes in the partial dependencies of the first normal form relation, and place those partial dependency dependent attributes in a relation where their corresponding determinant attributes are an entire candidate key.

Example 
The following relation does not satisfy 2NF because:

 {Manufacturer country} is functionally dependent on {Manufacturer}.
 {Manufacturer country} is not part of a candidate key, so it is a non-prime attribute. (It is assumed that it is possible for two manufacturers in the same country to make a toothbrush with the same model name, so {Manufacturer country, Model} is not a candidate key even though in the current table the pair uniquely identify rows.)
 {Manufacturer} is a proper subset of the {Manufacturer, Model} candidate key.

In other words, since {Manufacturer country} is a non-prime attribute functionally dependent on a proper subset of a candidate key, the relation is in violation of 2NF.

To make the design conform to 2NF, it is necessary to have two relations. To create these relations:

 Remove the functionally dependent attributes in the partial dependencies of the first normal form relation. In this example, {Manufacturer country} is the functionally dependent attribute which will be removed.
 Place those partial dependency dependent attributes (i.e. {Manufacturer country}) in a relation where their corresponding determinant attributes are a candidate key (i.e. {Manufacturer}).
As seen below, {Manufacturer country} is removed from the original table:

As seen below, the partial dependency is put into a new relation where the dependency can exist without being a partial dependency:

See also
Attribute-value system

References

Further reading

 Litt's Tips: Normalization

External links
Database Normalization Basics by Mike Chapple (About.com)
An Introduction to Database Normalization by Mike Hillyer.
A tutorial on the first 3 normal forms by Fred Coulson
Description of the database normalization basics by Microsoft

2NF

de:Normalisierung (Datenbank)#Zweite Normalform (2NF)